Scott Lochhead (born 23 January 1997) is a Scottish professional footballer, who plays as a midfielder for Australian cub Bentleigh Greens. Lochhead has previously played for Dunfermline Athletic, as well as Clyde and Forfar Athletic on loan.

Career
Lochhead began his career as a youth player with both Rangers and Celtic, before joining Dundee United in August 2014. After spending a year and a half at Tannadice, Lochhead left United on 11 January 2016. After six months without a club, Lochhead signed a short-term deal with recently promoted Scottish Championship club Dunfermline Athletic on 29 July 2016, after appearing as a trialist in a number of matches for the side.

His first appearance in a Dunfermline shirt came two days later, in a Scottish League Cup match against his former side Dundee United, where he came on as a 93rd-minute substitute for James Thomas. Lochhead subsequently signed contract extensions with the Pars in November 2016 and May 2017, keeping him at the club until May 2017 and 2018 respectively. On 31 January 2017, Lochhead moved on a development loan to Scottish League Two club Clyde until the end of the 2016–17 season, where he made 4 appearances.

Lochhead started the 2017–18 well for the Pars, making a number of first-team appearances before joining Scottish League One side Forfar Athletic on a short-term loan on 3 November 2017 After just 8 first team appearances, Lochhead left Dunfermline in May 2018. He joined National Premier Leagues Victoria club Bentleigh Greens in February 2019.

Career statistics

References

External links

1997 births
Living people
Scottish footballers
Association football midfielders
Dunfermline Athletic F.C. players
Clyde F.C. players
Forfar Athletic F.C. players
Bentleigh Greens SC players
Scottish Professional Football League players
Scottish expatriate sportspeople in Australia
Expatriate soccer players in Australia